Trelech (Welsh: Tre-lech) is a village in the parish of Tre-lech a'r Betws, Carmarthenshire, in south-west Wales. It is also the name of the community. Trelech is located some 10 miles north-west of Carmarthen and 6.5 miles south of Newcastle Emlyn.

Description
The population taken at the 2011 census was 745.

The community is bordered by the communities of: Cenarth; Cynwyl Elfed; Abernant; Meidrim; and Llanwinio, all being in Carmarthenshire; and by Clydau in Pembrokeshire.

The village is home to the Welsh-medium Ysgol Hafodwenog (Hafodwenog Community Primary School), which has around 60 pupils aged 4 to 11, and was opened in 1972 to serve the children of the surrounding settlements of Alma, Bryn Iwan, Cilrhedyn, Dinas, Gelliwen, Pandy, Penybont, and Talog, as well as those of Trelech itself.

Trelech has a community centre (in the building, across the road, which housed the modern school's predecessor) and a pub, the Tafarn Beca. However, given the area's very rural and lightly populated nature, the village no longer has a shop or post office. There is a children's play area, and the school also has a small soccer field.

Governance
A Trelech electoral ward exists which covers the area. This ward stretches beyond the confines of Trelech community with a total population at the 2011 Census of 2,072.

Notable people
 David Rees, (1801–1869), a reforming Welsh Congregationalist minister, also known as Y Cynhyrfwr
 Perceval Gibbon (1879–1926), an author, journalist, poet and short-story writer. 
 David Nott OBE OStJ FRCS (born 1956) a Welsh consultant surgeon in London, he volunteers to work in disaster and war zones. He grew up with his grandparents in Trelech

References

External links
Trelech Community Centre
Ysgol Hafodwenog

Communities in Carmarthenshire
Villages in Carmarthenshire